Lucky is a 2011 American crime comedy film directed by Gil Cates Jr. and starring Ari Graynor and Colin Hanks. The film featured the song "I Choose Happiness" by David Choi.

Plot 
A young blonde woman enters a gas station to buy a lottery ticket where the cashier, Chris, attempts to hit on her by asking for her ID before selling her a six-pack. She rebuffs him and begrudgingly hands him her license before receiving her receipt and the ticket then promptly walking off. While placing her money in the register, Chris notices her ID laying on the counter and runs out calling her name, Leslie, and receiving no response.

Lucy, another young blonde woman, gets ready on another morning. She readies herself for the day, noticeably filled with glee, putting on a sundress despite the 20 degree weather. Hurrying to her desk, she notices her male coworker, Steve Mason, and makes a slightly flirtatious move towards him before her phone begins to ring wildly, distracting her from him. Steve scribbles a note and lays it out before her which says 'ROOF NOOON'. During this time Ben approaches her and informs her of the jammed copy machine. Upset at having been distracted from Steve, she irritably assists her coworker before rushing up to the roof to meet Steve. There, he informs her that he wishes to break off their affair as she is 'not right for him.' Meanwhile, Ben is standing at the sandwich tray, searching for another tuna sandwich so that both he and Lucy can have one. When he sees one, he buys it and ventures to the roof to see if she would care to split it; however, having unknowingly stumbled upon such an intimate encounter, he hides until Steve leaves and Lucy notices him.
After an awkward elevator ride together where they share the sandwich, Ben goes to his office where his mother calls him to come home quickly for an emergency and Lucy walks into an important meeting led by Steve and informs the clients and employees about their sexual affair. Having realized she had probably lost her job, Lucy grabs her things and heads to the car garage where Ben notices her and beseeches her for a ride to his house. In the car, he experiences a flashback of them as kids and remembers him telling an indifferent Lucy that he loved her and how he kissed her before she screamed and ran away.

After thanking her for the ride, Ben enters the house and is surprised by a multitude of cameras and journalists who follow his mother as she explains that he won a $36 million lottery. Later, Ben asks for some silence and descends to his basement bedroom in his mother's house, turning onto a news station which covers his story before stating that the disappearance of Leslie may be linked to three other blonde female disappearances. Ben leisurely walks to his closet before opening the door where Leslie's body falls to the floor and he states that she won the lottery. In the car, Lucy hears about Ben Keller's win in the lottery.

Ben's life quickly changes. At work, they celebrate for him and Lucy makes whatever attempts she can to pay him all the attention she denied him previously, apologizing for her rude behavior. At her house before an 'accidental' encounter with Ben, a detective questions her on her knowledge of Leslie, who lived nearby. She continues to casually 'bump' into him as she waits outside of his house while 'jogging' to see him. When the mother invites her to go to an interview with them, Lucy excitedly accepts. After Pauline Keller, Ben's mother, feels ill, however, she demands of Ben to abandon the interview and "fuck following rules." By stating that he can do anything now as a millionaire, Ben's attraction to her heightens and they leave just before filming began.

Two months later, they are dating. They are shopping when Lucy's dominant ways become prominent through her control over his rigorous exercise routine, her control over his spending, and by telling him to buy a certain gift for his mother's birthday. While in the shop, Ben becomes frustrated and drops a statue, apologizing frantically afterwards before Lucy, again, empowers him by breaking two other statues. There, Ben proposes and they marry, spending money gloriously on a new house, a honeymoon, and their wedding. On the honeymoon, they run out of the month's lottery check and Lucy and Ben fight just as Lucy began to realize the growth of her genuine feelings for him. She hides in the bathroom after Ben accuses her interest as spawned from his money. When a maid comes to the door, Ben perceives her as Lucy apologizing before the image flickers and it is Alice, the maid, again. Overcome with his insanity, he follows her into a hotel suite and brutally murders her, witnessed by Lucy who'd come to apologize. He stages the scene to make the murder appear as though she slipped on a banana peel and Lucy goes to call the police before contemplating the money that would be lost if she called.

Frightened, when they return from their honeymoon, Lucy slowly adjusts back to slight feelings towards Ben, but quickly discovers the bodies of the three women buried in Ben's old back yard. As the house was to be renovated and the land dug up to install a pool, Lucy removes the bodies and reburies them, gradually succumbing to hallucinations of them conversing with her. Her fear intensifies as Ben pays attention to another woman who resembles Lucy. Believing she is pregnant, Lucy rushes to Pauline's house to verify if she was where she discovers that she knew all along of Ben's brutal actions. She begs her to run away with her, but Pauline declines and Lucy leaves. As Lucy leaves, Pauline calls and informs Ben where he tricks her into getting arrested.

By paying off a jury, she is locked away in jail for her life. Ben comes to visit her soon after - just before their one-year anniversary - where Lucy states how she has planned to "set him on fire" once she is released because she has realized his bloodlust for another blonde female will rise soon again. When he tells her that the need has, in fact, died, she explodes before coming to a state of sanity again and engaging in a light conversation similar to one they had before they had married, inquiring about his workout routine and then chastising him for skipping a day.

Cast 
Colin Hanks as Ben Keller
Ari Graynor as Lucy St. Martin
Ann-Margret as Pauline Keller
Mimi Rogers as Ms. Brand
Jeffrey Tambor as Detective Harold Waylon
Adam J. Harrington as Steve Mason

Reception

Review aggregator Rotten Tomatoes reported that 23% of critics gave the film a positive review, based on 13 reviews.

The rating website MovieMavericks gave the film a 2 1/2 star rating saying,"check out Lucky if you’re out of new things to watch, but there are plenty of other films to see first." Kirk Honeycutt of Hollywood Reporter gave a negative review saying, "Director Gil Cates Jr. and his writing partner Kent Sublette, along with star Colin Hanks, attempt to recapture the spirit of those 1950s Ealing Studio comedies, but fail to get lucky. Nothing is bleaker than failed black comedy, which this is."

References

External links
 
 

2011 films
2011 comedy films
2011 independent films
2010s crime comedy films
2010s serial killer films
American crime comedy films
American independent films
American serial killer films
Films directed by Gil Cates Jr.
Films scored by John Swihart
Films shot in Iowa
Films shot in Nebraska
Films about lotteries
2010s English-language films
2010s American films